Goran Stolevski, born 1985/1986, is a Macedonian Australian film director and screenwriter. He made his feature film directorial debut with the 2022 film You Won't Be Alone, which premiered at the 2022 Sundance Film Festival.

His second feature film, Of an Age, was the winner of the Best Film Award at CinefestOZ in 2022.

Stolevski was born in North Macedonia, and emigrated to Australia with his family in childhood. He is openly gay.

Filmography

Directorial work

References

External links 

Australian film directors
Australian male screenwriters
Living people
Year of birth missing (living people)
Australian people of Macedonian descent
Australian gay writers
LGBT film directors
Australian LGBT screenwriters
North Macedonia LGBT people
21st-century Australian LGBT people
21st-century Australian screenwriters
21st-century Australian male writers